Mariángel Ruiz Torrealba (born 7 January 1980) is a Venezuelan actress, TV Host, fashion model and beauty pageant titleholder. Winning Miss Venezuela 2002 as Miss Aragua, she then placed 1st runner-up at Miss Universe 2003. Ruiz has been the most publicized Miss Venezuela in the 21st century, having been compared to compatriot and Miss Universe 1996 Alicia Machado in terms of buzz generated in her entire pageant career.

Pageant career

Miss Venezuela 2002
Ruiz actually tried twice for the Miss Venezuela title, the first time in 1998 when she did not even place into the top 120 candidates. In 2002, she won the preliminary casting in Maracay, becoming Miss Aragua 2002. For the national pageant, she was not a favorite and was predicted to place as finalist as best. Her most favorite years were Vanessa Fanesi (Yaracuy), Amara Barroeta (Distrito Capital), Solsiret Herrera (Monagas), and Driva Cedeño (Nueva Esparta), as well as Aida Yespica (Amazonas) and Maria Fernanda Leon (Portuguesa), the only candidates to ever compete twice in Miss Venezuela history (not including Miss Republica Bolivariana Venezuela 2000). Ruiz won the pageant in a shock outcome, which for the first time was judged entirely by former Miss Venezuela titleholders.

Miss Universe 2003
After being crowned Miss Venezuela, Ruiz had to confront several obstacles before being able to represent her homeland in the Miss Universe pageant. First of all, was gaining Osmel Sousa's approval, who considered Ruiz to be "rebellious" and threatened to send Amara Barroeta, her first runner-up, to Miss Universe if she did not stop her weight gain and focus on her training. Soon after, a hugely publicized "crisis" emerged in which it was claimed that the Miss Venezuela Organization did not have enough hard currency, due to President Hugo Chavez's government imposition of foreign exchange controls that same year, to pay the franchise fee and send its delegate. At the same time, Sousa agreed to train Amelia Vega, Miss Dominican Republic, for a week in Caracas while Ruiz was placed on "standby".

Venezuela's pending participation at Miss Universe 2003 attracted international news coverage. After weeks of negotiations, including an intervention by the President of Panama, the Cisneros Organization was able to fund Mariángel's travel and she arrived late at Miss Universe 2003, barely meeting the deadline to register. Her semifinal performance was met with mixed reviews, with some critics believing that she might be the first Miss Venezuela in two decades to miss the semifinals (which would eventually happen the following year) and others predicting that her controversies would bring her the crown.

On the final night of Miss Universe 2003, the announcers called out the wrong title when she appeared onstage: the order of the contestants was messed up backstage for the swimsuit contest and Ruiz appeared when Cindy Nell of South Africa should have come onstage. Co-host Daisy Fuentes then called South Africa twice, to which Ruiz made an infamous expression of confusion before taking the stage. The scoring was not affected and Daisy corrected herself as Ruiz left the stage. 

Later during the night gown competition, Ruiz broke two conventions. First, she wore her hair down and little makeup, against Sousa's suggestions, and second, she wore a skin-tight Angel Sanchez crimson gown, becoming the first Venezuelan Miss Universe contestant in a decade to not compete in a white, metallic, or light-toned dress. Defying Sousa's orders to undergo plastic surgery since her stint on the national pageant, Ruiz came off as one of the freshest Miss Universe contestants in history from Venezuela, setting the trend for future Miss Venezuela titleholders to oppose plastic surgery procedures during preparations before competing at Miss Universe. 

During the interviews, co-host Billy Bush asked Ruiz about her supposed favorite pastime, rappelling and extreme sports. Confusion among the producers rose, as Ruiz does not practice either, commenting instead that "I love my life and protect it 100%". Ruiz eventually placed runner-up to Amelia Vega of Dominican Republic at Miss Universe 2003. The Dominican Republic's victory in Miss Universe 2003 - the country's first ever national win in the competition - over Venezuela stirred controversy after infuriating television network executives of Venevision that not only the winner of the Miss Universe contest had been groomed by their company, their own national representative was on "standby" and came in second to her. As a result, the Miss Venezuela Organization imposed a still-standing ban on training other nations' contestants, ending its decades-long period of allowing foreign pageant candidates to train in the country.

Work on TV

Ruiz has appeared on several TV shows of Venevisión. Her main credits include:

Bailando con las Estrellas (2005), as Contestant
Portada's (2005–present), as Hostess
Cosita Rica (2003), as Alegria Mendez
 Que Locura (2003), as Guest Hostess
 La viuda joven (2011) as Inmaculada Von Parker
 Corazón Esmeralda (2014) as Marina Lozano / Graciela Beltrán

She has also done specials for the Miss Venezuela and Mister Venezuela pageants.  In October 2005, she started filming the show Bailando con las Estrellas (Dancing with the Stars), which is similar to several other shows in other countries with the same format. Ruiz was threatened twice: she made it through on the first one, but on the second threat she got eliminated.

Personal life

She was born in San Juan de los Morros, Guárico. In December 2005, she announced her marriage and pregnancy to Major League Baseball center fielder Tony Álvarez. Their civil wedding was the same month, and their religious wedding was held on 28 January 2006. Ruiz gave birth to a girl named Mariángel Victoria, in August of the same year. The two divorced in 2008.

Publicity

Ruiz has worked with several companies to promote their products, those include:

Pantene (2005)
Lady Speed Stick (2004)
Atun Margarita (2003)
Mayonesa Kraft (2003)
Calzados Lucchi (2002)

Modeling

In November 2008, Ruiz posed for the cover of the prestigious Venezuelan Urbe Bikini magazine.

Accomplishments

References

External links
MariangelRuiz.com.ve — Official Spanish website

1980 births
Living people
Miss Universe 2003 contestants
Miss Venezuela winners
People from Guárico
Spouses of politicians
Venezuelan television talk show hosts
Venezuelan female models
Venezuelan television personalities
Venezuelan television presenters
Venezuelan telenovela actresses
Venezuelan women television presenters